Åna-Sira Church is a parish church of the Church of Norway in Sokndal Municipality in Rogaland county, Norway. It is located in the village of Åna-Sira, on the northwest shore of the river Sira on the border with Agder county. It is one of the two churches for the Sokndal parish which is part of the Dalane prosti (deanery) in the Diocese of Stavanger. The white, wooden church was built in a long church style in 1888 using designs by the architect Jacob Wilhelm Nordan. The church seats about 100 people. The church was consecrated on 16 March 1888.

Media gallery

See also
List of churches in Rogaland

References

Sokndal
Churches in Rogaland
Wooden churches in Norway
19th-century Church of Norway church buildings
Churches completed in 1888
1888 establishments in Norway